Shnaider or Shnayder are surnames,   variants of Schneider as transliterated from the Russified spelling . It may refer to:

Alex Shnaider, Canadian businessman
Diana Shnaider, Russian tennis player
Dmitry Shnayder, a  Kyrgyzstani athlete
Shaya Shnayder, birth name of Sacha Moldovan,  Russian-born American expressionist and post-impressionist painter